Bevan Davies is an American musician best known as the drummer for the groups Still Rain, Madfly, Comes with the Fall and Danzig while he is currently a member of MonstrO, a group he formed with former members of Bloodsimple and Torche. Previously, Davies had also been a touring drummer for Jerry Cantrell, Static-X, Engelbert Humperdinck, Cardboard Vampyres, The Mercy Clinic, Invitro and Bloodsimple.

Biography

Early career, Still Rain and Mouthpiece (1990–1996) 
Bevan Davies began his musical career drumming for Still Rain in the early 1990s. When the band disbanded in 1995, Davies joined his former Still Rain bandmates in Mouthpiece, recording an EP in 1996 before departing the group.

Madfly, Comes with the Fall and Jerry Cantrell (1996–present) 

In 1996, Davies joined Madfly, in Atlanta, Georgia, with singer William DuVall, guitarist Nico Constantine and bassist Jeffery Blount. After releasing two albums, Get the Silver and White Hot in the Black, the band became Comes with the Fall in 1999 with Adam Stanger replacing Jeffery Blount on bass.

The group recorded their self-titled album in Atlanta, a year later, before relocating to Los Angeles. Their self-titled album was released the same year through DuVall's DVL Records.

In 2001, Comes with the Fall were announced as the main support, along with Swarm, for Jerry Cantrell's solo tour. When Cantrell's then solo bandmates, bassist Robert Trujillo and drummer Mike Bordin, are unavailable for shows, he enlisted Stanger and Davies to perform as his backing band. They toured with Cantrell throughout 2001.

The Year is One, the band's second album, was released later in the year to positive reviews. The following year, Comes with the Fall were announced to be Cantrell's opening and backing band for his tour in support of Degradation Trip, Cantrell's second solo album. Comes with the Fall toured with Cantrell throughout 2002, while they released a live album, titled Live 2002, the same year. A live DVD Live Underground 2002 towards the end of the 2003 and they planned to record and release a new album by 2004.

In February 2007, the band announced their first tour dates in three-and-a-half years, performing material from their EP, The Reckoning as well as their unreleased album. They released the album, Beyond the Last Light, the same year.

Danzig (2003–2005, 2010) 

During a Comes with the Fall tour in 2003, Davies left the group to join Danzig, with drummer Brian Hunter doing double duty performing with Dropsonic and Comes with the Fall. Though Davies was announced as an official member of Danzig, he would still be a member of Comes with the Fall with DuVall stating that his departure was only temporary.

Davies recorded an album with Danzig in 2004, titled Circle of Snakes, which was released on August 31 the same year. He continued to tour with the group, playing at the reunion shows of Glenn Danzig and Doyle Wolfgang von Frankenstein, before departing in 2005.
Davies rejoined Danzig in 2010 for the Blackest Of The Black Tour.

MonstrO (2010–2012) 

In 2010, Davies formed MonstrO with former Bloodsimple bassist Kyle Sanders, former Torche guitarist Juan Montoya and vocalist Charlie Suarez. They posted two songs for streaming, titled "Anchors Up!" and "April", on their MySpace and made their live debut a Lenny's bar in Atlanta.
MonstrO released their debut album, produced by William DuVall, on Vagrant Records in 2011 and toured the United States with Kyuss Lives!, Black Tusk, The Sword, Clutch, Hellyeah, Kyng, Danzig and Alice In Chains.

Solo album 2016 
Bevan Davies released a solo album in 2016 with help from friends within the music industry. The project was produced by Jeff Hoglen and features artists such as Nathan Utz (Formerly of Lynch Mob and current singer for Resist and Bite), William Duvall (Alice in Chains), Roy Cathey (The Fifth), Brent Hinds (Mastodon), Jeremy Asbrock (Gene Simmons, Ace Frehley Band), Philip Shouse (ACCEPT, Ace Frehley, Gene Simmons), Tuk Smith (The Biters), and Noah Pine (solo artist), and Daniel Silvestri (ACCEPT, Wolf Hoffmanns "Headbangers Symphony")

Other work 
In 2004, Davies toured as Engelbert Humperdinck's drummer during a US tour while in 2005, Davies joined Cardboard Vampyres, a cover band formed by Jerry Cantrell and Billy Duffy before joining The Mercy Clinic, formed by Patrick Lachman.

Davies temporarily joined Static-X, filling in for injured drummer Nick Oshiro in 2007, as well as Invitro the same year, filling in for Bennie Cancino on the Family Values Tour. He would later join Bloodsimple as drummer on their tour of the US, UK and Australia.
In 2009, Davies rejoined Static-X for an Australian tour and became a member of Wayne Static's solo band in 2013 for Static's final United States tour. Davies recorded drums in 2009 for Lady Gaga's performance on Much Music's Award show. In 2014, Davies recorded drums for a W.A.S.P. song to be included on the next W.A.S.P. album.

Discography

Videography

References

External links 

American heavy metal drummers
Comes with the Fall members
Danzig (band) members
Madfly members
Living people
Year of birth missing (living people)
Place of birth missing (living people)